Jefferson Angulo Murillo (born December 26, 1986) is a professional footballer who last played for Fortaleza CEIF.

Career

Club career
Jefferson Angulo began his career in the youth ranks of Atlético Nacional and Deportivo Pereira. He made his professional debut in 2004 with Pereira, and than went on to play for smaller Colombian clubs Alianza Petrolera and Atlético Bello.

He made his First division debut for Atlético Nacional against La Equidad on July 20, 2007. He remained at the club for two seasons and than joined fellow top flight club Atlético Huila in 2009. In mid-season he joined Brazilian club Vila Nova and appeared in four matches for the club. In 2010, he left Vila Nova and signed with Gremio Santanense. His stay at the club was short as he left once again in mid-season to join FK Baku in Azerbaijan.

In early 2011 Angulo returned to Colombia signing with top side Millonarios.

References

External links

1986 births
Living people
Colombian footballers
Colombian expatriate footballers
Colombia under-20 international footballers
Azerbaijan Premier League players
Categoría Primera A players
Campeonato Brasileiro Série B players
Liga Nacional de Fútbol de Guatemala players
Deportivo Pereira footballers
Alianza Petrolera players
Atlético Bello footballers
Atlético Nacional footballers
Atlético Huila footballers
Vila Nova Futebol Clube players
FC Baku players
Millonarios F.C. players
Águilas Doradas Rionegro players
Once Caldas footballers
Guaratinguetá Futebol players
Duque de Caxias Futebol Clube players
C.D. Suchitepéquez players
Jaguares de Córdoba footballers
Fortaleza C.E.I.F. footballers
Association football midfielders
Expatriate footballers in Azerbaijan
Expatriate footballers in Brazil
Expatriate footballers in Guatemala
Colombian expatriate sportspeople in Azerbaijan
Colombian expatriate sportspeople in Brazil
Colombian expatriate sportspeople in Guatemala
People from Pereira, Colombia